Fort Christanna was one of the projects of Lt. Governor Alexander Spotswood, who was governor of the Virginia Colony 1710–1722. When Fort Christanna opened in 1714, Capt. 
Robert Hicks was named captain of the fort and he relocated his family to the area. His homestead Hicks' Ford is located near the municipality of Emporia in Greensville County, VA. The fort was designed to offer protection and schooling to the tributary Siouan and Iroquoian tribes living to the southwest of the colonized area of Virginia. Located in what became Brunswick County, Virginia, near Gholsonville, the fort was completed in 1714 and enjoyed three successful years of operation as the westernmost outpost of the British Empire at the time, before being finally closed by the House of Burgesses in 1718.  However, the Saponi and Tutelo continued to live on the allotted land, 6 miles square (36 sq. mi), into the 1730s and 1740s.

Background

After the Tuscarora War broke out in 1711, Spotswood conceived the idea of a fort where he would settle the Siouan and Iroquoian tribes of Virginia that had been Tributary since 1677.  The fort would offer them protection from hostile tribes, act as a trading center, and also provide schooling to their children to learn English culture.  In late 1713, he got his idea approved by the Burgesses; it was to be under the jurisdiction of the newly formed Virginia Indian Company, which had a monopoly.

History

In 1714 Spotswood himself visited the site and successfully persuaded the Siouan tribes, who included the Saponi, Tutelo, Occaneechi, and Nahyssan, to occupy the tract that was surveyed. However, the Iroquoian tribes in Virginia, the Nottoway and Meherrin, refused to take up their portion, saying they would not live with the Siouans. Spotswood even contemplated abducting them to make them live at the fort, but they eluded all efforts.

He named the fort "Christ-Anna" after Christ, and after Queen Anne, who died later that year. It was built according to state-of-the-art principles of fort construction at that time, in the shape of a pentagon, and a blockhouse with 1400-lb cannon at each of the 5 corners, 100 yards apart, so as to enable each to command within sight of the next two. Inside the fort was a school for Indian children, taught by a Charles Griffin, where they learned to speak and write English, and to read the Bible and Book of Common Prayer.

Lieut. John Fontaine, who spent some time there 1715–1716, left a detailed account of his observations on the Indians, and also recorded about 45-50 words and phrases of their Tutelo-Saponi language.  He saw the fort at the peak of its success, and described hordes of "happy Indian children shrieking through the rain". Another visitor, Rev. Hugh Jones, reported that the 77 Indian students could read, write and say their catechisms tolerably well, and that the natives adored Griffin so much, they "fain would have chosen him for a King of the Sapony Nation".

Spotswood continued to take a keen interest and later started building his own house nearby, bringing his family there at one point in 1717.

Decline

The monopoly of the Virginia Indian Company on trading soon aroused the ire of private merchants such as William Byrd II, who had inherited his father's lucrative Indian trade. While back in London, he lobbied the Lords of Trade, arguing that Christanna was an unnecessary expense, and calling on them to return to independent trade and dissolve the company.  Despite Spotswood's objections, they did so on November 12, 1717.  In May 1718, a treaty was signed with the Iroquois of New York, whereby they agreed not to come east of the Blue Ridge, and the Burgesses thereupon voted to discontinue manning the fort.  Mr Griffin remained until September, then transferred to become master of the Indian school at the College of William & Mary.

The Saponi and Tutelo remained on the tract for several more years, at a village called Junkatapurse (Tutelo: chunketa pasui, "horse's head"). They began moving elsewhere in small bands around 1730.  The largest part of them moved to Shamokin, Pennsylvania in 1740, where they joined the Iroquois, and were formally adopted by the Cayuga nation in New York in 1753. Meanwhile, colonists had begun moving to the lands around the fort in such numbers that in 1720, Brunswick County was formed there as a separate county.

The five large cannon once at the fort are supposed to have been buried in the well; its location is currently uncertain.  A lesser cannon said to be from Christanna was for years in the front yard of a private home in the vicinity, fired every July 4 and Christmas, and in 1900, was moved to sit in front of the Christopher Wren Building at William and Mary. Another lesser cannon attributed to Christanna was taken to Lawrenceville, Virginia and fired to celebrate the election of Grover Cleveland in 1887, at which time it accidentally exploded; its remains in 1975 were said to be buried in the filled-in cellar of a former home.

It was listed on the National Register of Historic Places in 1980, as a national historic district.

References

Gay Neale, Brunswick County Virginia 1720-1975

Archaeological sites on the National Register of Historic Places in Virginia
1714 establishments in Virginia
1718 disestablishments in the Thirteen Colonies
Colony of Virginia
Native American history of Virginia
Brunswick County, Virginia
Christianna
Christianna
National Register of Historic Places in Brunswick County, Virginia
Christianna
National Society of the Colonial Dames of America
Historic districts on the National Register of Historic Places in Virginia